Black & Bruised is a boxing-based fighting video game developed by Digital Fiction and published by Majesco Entertainment in 2003 in North America; in the PAL regions such as Europe and Australia it was published by Vivendi Universal Games.

Gameplay
1P Fight - Player fights against a CPU

2P Fight - Player vs Player 

Survival - Fight for as long as you can 

In order to complete the game,
the player must play through the "life" of each fighter, which consists of multiple fights interspersed with cutscenes. Additionally, there is a tournament mode with varying difficulties. Completion of the tournaments is required to unlock the hidden fighters, who each come with their own "life" to play through.

Reception

The game received "mixed or average reviews" on both platforms according to video game review aggregator Metacritic.

See also
List of fighting games

References

External links

Majesco's website for Black & Bruised with screenshots

2003 video games
Boxing video games
GameCube games
Majesco Entertainment games
Multiplayer and single-player video games
PlayStation 2 games
Video games developed in Canada
Video games set in Ireland
Video games set in the United States
Video games set in Canada
Video games set in England
Video games set in Mexico
Video games set in Japan
Video games set in Spain
Video games set in China
Video games set in Mongolia